Sterrhoptilus is a songbird genus recently separated from Stachyris.  It used to be placed in the family Timaliidae. With other "Old World babblers" of the genus Yuhina, it was recently determined to be better placed in the family Zosteropidae.

The genus contains the following four species:

Rusty-crowned babbler, Sterrhoptilus capitalis
Golden-crowned babbler, Sterrhoptilus dennistouni
Calabarzon babbler, Sterrhoptilus affinis – split from S. nigrocapitatus
Visayan babbler, Sterrhoptilus nigrocapitatus

References

Collar, N. J. & Robson, C. 2007. Family Timaliidae (Babblers)  pp. 70 – 291 in; del Hoyo, J., Elliott, A. & Christie, D.A. eds. Handbook of the Birds of the World, Vol. 12. Picathartes to Tits and Chickadees. Lynx Edicions, Barcelona.

 
Bird genera
Old World babblers

Taxa named by Harry C. Oberholser